"Blinkar blå" ("Flashing Blue") was the breakthrough single for the Swedish synthpop band Adolphson & Falk when it was played in the Swedish radio show Eldorado in 1981. The single was their first synth-single (with Greg FitzPatrick controlling the synths).

Original release 1981 
"Blinkar blå" was recorded on 4–5 November 1981 in Riksradions studio 7 in Stockholm. "Rum för dig" was an older acoustic song recorded in 1980 in KMH Studio.

Track listing 
"Blinkar blå" 4.34
"Rum för dig" 4.20

English version 
The song was released in 1982 in an English version, "Flashing Blue".

Track listing 
"Flashing Blue"
"Astronaut"

Re-release 
In 2006 an acoustic version of "Blinkar blå" was released.

Charts

References

Swedish songs
Swedish-language songs
1981 songs